Mahmoud Refaat (Arabic: محمود رفعت‎, romanized: Mahmood Rifaat; born April 25, 1978) is an international relations scholar (president of the  European Institute for International Law and International Relations), writer, and lawyer.

Refaat was born in Cairo in Egypt. He managed the presidential campaign of former Egyptian Army Chief of Staff Lieutenant General Sami Anan during 2018 Egyptian presidential election. He also established the International Action Group for Peace in Libya and the Humanitarian Action Group for Yemen.

Biography 
Refaat is a French-Belgian citizen of Egyptian origin. He was born in Cairo, Egypt.

In 2018, Mahmoud Refaat managed the presidential campaign of former Egyptian Army Chief of Staff Lieutenant General Sami Anan from abroad.

On May 12, 2018, Mahmoud Refaat and former Libyan Prime Minister Omar al-Hassi founded the International Action Group for Peace in Libya and assumed the position of General Coordinator. The group aims to put an end to civil war in Libya, and to work with the International Criminal Court (ICC).

In March 2019, Refaat launched the Humanitarian Action Group for Yemen.

Selected publications 
Some of his publications are:

 Islamic Terrorism, Myth and Reality, 2021, .
 Islamophobia: Roots, Consequences and Solutions, 2021, .
 International Law and Global Governance, 2019, .
 Role of International Law in International Politics, 2017, .
 The Role of the International Criminal Court in the International Peace, 2013, .
 International Economic Sanctions in International law and In Practice, 2014, .
 Ethics and Religion in International Relations - Usage and Investment, 2012, .
 The Complementarity of National and International Criminal Legal Systems, 2011, .

References 

1978 births
Living people
French people of Egyptian descent
Belgian people of Egyptian descent